Mastigolina is a genus of tephritid  or fruit flies in the family Tephritidae.

Species
Mastigolina bequaerti (Munro, 1934)
Mastigolina rufocomata Munro, 1947

References

Tephritinae
Tephritidae genera
Diptera of Africa